Gradišče pri Materiji is a village in the Municipality of Hrpelje-Kozina in the Littoral region of Slovenia.

Name
The name of the settlement was changed from Gradišče to Gradišče pri Materiji in 1953.

Church
The local church is dedicated to Saint Primus and belongs to the Parish of Slivje.

References

External links

Gradišče pri Materiji on Geopedia

Populated places in the Municipality of Hrpelje-Kozina